BHB may refer to:

Ballas Hough Band, a band formed by dancers Mark Ballas and Derek Hough
BHB (album), the debut album by the Ballas Hough Band
beta-Hydroxybutyric acid, also known as Beta hydroxy butyrate
British Horseracing Board, former governing board for horse racing in Great Britain
Hancock County–Bar Harbor Airport, airport near Bar Harbor, Maine with IATA code BHB 
a weapon system described in the book, Endgame: The Blueprint for Victory in the War on Terror
New People's Army
Bobby Hammer Band, a band formed by Austrian musician Robert Haumer